Ram Singh Sodha (16 January 1945 - 13 February 2021) was a former Pakistani Hindu politician. A member of the opposition Pakistan Muslim League (Q), he held a seat reserved for non-Muslims in the Provincial Assembly of Sindh, but in 2011 resigned and moved to India.

Family and personal life
Sodho was born in Arokhi, Diplo, Tharparkar District, but later moved to Dileep Nagar in the district capital Mithi. He is a lawyer by profession. He was born into an influential family in Sindh. His father Ran Singh Sodha was influential in his home community. Ransingh sodha was the chairman of the union council Arokhi till up to death. Ransingh has no real sister he was only one son of Samersingh sodha. Samersingh sodha was the member of the district council Tharparkar at Mirpurkhas

Sodha's sons preceded him in moving to India. One son Dileep Singh moved there around 2001, but died in Bhuj during the 2001 Gujarat earthquake. His other son Guman Singh Sodha was an elected member of the Tharparkar district council and a construction contractor; in 2005, Pakistan Peoples Party member and Sindh MPA Nisar Ahmed Khuhro levelled corruption accusations against him, claiming that Guman had used his connections to Arbab Ghulam Rahim to amass millions of rupees.( The above statement is totally wrong as it was the time of election campaign and it was a political statement spoken by Nishar Ahmed Khuhro) In 2007, Gumansingh moved to India as well, without formally resigning from the district council. The Hindustan Times reports that Sodho also may have other relatives in the Indian states of Gujarat and Rajasthan.

Career
Sodho was first elected to the Provincial Assembly of Sindh in 1985. He also served as deputy mayor of Tharparkar District from 2001–2005. In 2008, when the PML gained a ninth seat in the Sindh Assembly, it was allocated to a non-Muslim, and as such to Sodho as he was at the top of the candidate priority list. He was a member of the Standing Committee on Public Health Engineering and the Standing Committee on Minority Affairs, and the chairman of the Standing Committee on Youth Affairs & Sports.

Resignation
Conflicting reports surround Sodho's resignation; it may have been sparked by threats on his life, or his ongoing health troubles. It was reported as early as November 2010 that both Arbab Ghulam Rahim and Sodho had not attended legislative sessions for a long time, and were said by their fellow PML-Q MPA to be out of the country and to have been granted leave by the assembly. Speaker Nisar Ahmed Khuhro was reported by Dawn to have received Sodho's handwritten resignation letter on 26 January, following a phone call the previous day. The Election Commission of Pakistan filled Sodho's seat with new appointee Chettan Mal Arwani, the next non-Muslim candidate on the PML-Q list. Sodho stated that he was stepping down for health reasons; colleague Abdul Razzaque Rahmo stated that spinal cord problems had left him with mobility issues. In contrast, Sodho's cousin Paret Lal stated that Sodho had received threats on his life, and Pitambar Sewani of the PPP claims that Sodho had been seeking political asylum in India for several years.

See also
Pakistanis in India

References

1945 births
Pakistani emigrants to India
Pakistani Hindus
Pakistan Muslim League (Q) politicians
People from Tharparkar District
Living people
Sindh MPAs 2008–2013